Al Raya (Arabic: الراية; also known as Arrayah; The Banner) is an Arabic daily newspaper published in Doha, Qatar. It is semi-official newspaper of the country and is one of the five leading Qatari dailies. As for Arabic dailies published in the country Al Raya is among the three major newspapers along with Al Sharq and Al Watan.

History and profile
Al Raya was launched by Gulf company for printing and publishing as a weekly newspaper on 10 May 1979. The company which was founded by Ali bin Jaber Al Thani also owns Gulf Times, an English-language daily. Based in Doha, Al Raya is the second Arabic newspaper published in Qatar. On 27 January 1980 Al Raya was relaunched as a daily newspaper.

In 1996 a corpus was created which included 187 articles published in Al Raya. On 27 April 2012 the paper launched the mapping mangroves project.

Political stance and content
Although Al Raya is privately owned, it is the semi-official newspaper of Qatar. Therefore, it has a pro-government stance. The major rival of the daily is another Arabic Qatari newspaper Al Sharq which has opposite political stance.

Al Raya mostly provides news about the receptions and activities of the ruling family, Al Thani, as well as about official events. In addition, the daily has large supplements on sports and business as well as a special supplement called He and She. The paper offered a weekly page on the environmental issues from 1999 to 2005.

Following the 2013 coup in Egypt, Al Raya concentrated on the ongoing demonstrations of supporters of the Muslim Brotherhood and ousted President Mohamed Morsi. In August 2013, an editorial of the paper argued that possible US-led intervention against Syria would not be celebrated, but the Assad regime was "useless" and caused no other option than such intervention.

Staff
Nasser Mohamed Al-Othman is the first editor-in-chief of the daily newspaper. In the initial period many leading Arab journalists wrote for the daily. Abdulla Ghanim Al Binali Al Muhannadi is the editor-in-chief of the daily.

Circulation
In the early 1990s Al Raya had a circulation of 10,000 copies and was distributed in Saudi Arabia and Egypt in addition to its native Qatar. Until 1995 when the other Arabic daily, Al Watan, was launched the paper enjoyed higher levels of circulation, but then lost its one-third of circulation. In 2000 Al Raya was the second best selling newspaper in Qatar with a circulation of 18,000 copies. The estimated circulation of the paper in 2003 was 8,000 copies. Al Raya's circulation increased to 18,000 copies in 2008. The online version of the paper was the 47th most visited website for 2010 in the MENA region.

References

External links
 

1979 establishments in Qatar
Arabic-language newspapers
Mass media in Doha
Newspapers established in 1979
Newspapers published in Qatar
Weekly newspapers